The 2019 Seniors Irish Masters was a senior snooker tournament that took place from 5 to 6 January 2019 at Goffs in Kill, County Kildare, Ireland. It was the second event on the 2018/2019 World Seniors Tour.

Patrick Wallace and Rodney Goggins qualified for the event through qualification tournaments in Celbridge and Dublin respectively. They took their places in the tournament alongside 2018 World Seniors Champion Aaron Canavan and five legends of the sport.

Steve Davis won the 2018 event, beating Jonathan Bagley 4–0 in the final, but chose not to defend his title.

Jimmy White won the event with a 4–1 victory in the final against Rodney Goggins.

Prize fund
The breakdown of prize money is shown below:
Winner: €7,500
Runner-up: €2,500
Semi-finals: €1,000
Highest break: €500
Total: €14,000

Main draw

 All matches played with a 30-second shot clock, with players having two time-outs per match
 *Re-spotted black replaced final frame deciders

Final

Century breaks
Total: 1

 101  Jimmy White

References 

World Seniors Tour
2019 in snooker
2019 in Irish sport
Snooker competitions in Ireland
Sport in County Kildare
Seniors Irish Masters